Forest Hills Historic District is a national historic district located at Indianapolis, Indiana.  It encompasses 173 contributing buildings and 7 contributing structures in a planned residential section of Indianapolis.  It developed between about 1911 and 1935, and includes representative examples of Tudor Revival and English Cottage style architecture.

It was listed on the National Register of Historic Places in 1983.

References

Historic districts on the National Register of Historic Places in Indiana
Tudor Revival architecture in Indiana
Historic districts in Indianapolis
National Register of Historic Places in Indianapolis
1911 establishments in Indiana